"Proornis"  is an extinct genus of basal bird from the Early Cretaceous (Barremian, 130-125 mya) Gyeongsang Supergroup of northernmost North Korea. Since it was never formally described in a peer-reviewed journal, the genus is considered a nomen nudum. A single species, "Proornis coreae", is known.

Fossil remains of this animal, discovered in 1993 in Sinuiju series deposits at Sinuiju-si, consist of a skull, a few cervical vertebrae and a forelimb with feathers. Confuciusornis-like features include the finger bones proportionately shorter than the metacarpals, unlike in Archaeopteryx (Lee et al. 2001). Also, the first phalanx of digit III is much shorter than the remaining phalanges, and the claw of digit II is smaller than that of digit III.

References

Early Cretaceous birds of Asia
Fossils of North Korea
Fossil taxa described in 1993
Nomina nuda